Kolesnikovo is a rural locality (a khutor) in Kopanyanskoye Rural Settlement, Olkhovatsky District, Voronezh Oblast, Russia. The population was 95 as of 2010.

Geography 
Kolesnikovo is located 34 km northwest of Olkhovatka (the district's administrative centre) by road. Kopanaya 1-ya is the nearest rural locality.

References 

Rural localities in Olkhovatsky District